Puerto Rico competed at the 2012 Summer Paralympics in London, United Kingdom from August 29 to September 9, 2012.

Athletics 

Men’s Field Events

Sailing 

* Due to a lack of wind Race 11 was cancelled

See also

 Puerto Rico at the 2012 Summer Olympics

References

Nations at the 2012 Summer Paralympics
2012
2012 in Puerto Rican sports